The pygmy hatchetfish (Carnegiella myersi) is a species of hatchetfish native to Peru.

Named for ichthyologist George S. Myers (1905-1985) of Stanford University, because of his  contributions towards expanding the knowledge of South American fishes.

Size
The pygmy hatchetfish grows to about 2.2 centimeters, or 0.9 inches.

In the aquarium
Pygmy hatchetfish are peaceful fish that do well in a community tank.

References

External links
 Fishbase
 FishGeeks

Gasteropelecidae
Freshwater fish of Peru
Fishkeeping
Taxa named by Augustín Fernández-Yépez
Fish described in 1950